Donald Trump's farewell address was the final official speech of Donald Trump as the 45th President of the United States, delivered as a recorded, online video message on January 19, 2021. The farewell address was delivered the day before Joe Biden, who defeated him in the 2020 United States presidential election, was sworn in as his successor.

Background 

Trump served a single term as the 45th President of the United States, winning the 2016 presidential election against Democratic nominee Hillary Clinton. He was inaugurated on January 20, 2017. While in office, Trump cut back spending to major welfare programs, enacted tariffs, withdrew from the Trans-Pacific Partnership negotiations and signed the USMCA, a successor agreement to NAFTA, grew the national debt through spending increases and tax cuts for the rich, and enacted a unilateral foreign policy based in offensive realism.

Trump was involved in many controversies related to his policies, conduct, and statements, including an investigation into the Trump campaign's coordination with the Russian government in the 2016 election, the House of Representatives impeaching him in December 2019 for abuse of power and obstruction of Congress after he solicited Ukraine to investigate Biden (he was acquitted by the Senate in February 2020), his family separation policy for migrants apprehended at the U.S.–Mexico border, limitations on the number of immigrants permitted from certain countries (many of which were Muslim-majority), demand for the federal funding of a border wall that resulted in the longest federal government shutdown in U.S. history, withdrawal from the Iran nuclear deal, withdrawal from the Paris Accords, attempts to repeal the Affordable Care Act (ACA), and loosening of the enforcement of numerous environmental regulations.

His re-election loss to Biden came amidst a series of international crises, including the COVID-19 pandemic and resulting recession, and protests and riots following the police murder of George Floyd. In the aftermath of the election, Trump repeatedly falsely claimed that widespread electoral fraud had occurred and that he had won the election. Although many resulting lawsuits were either dismissed or ruled against by numerous courts, he nevertheless urged his supporters on January 6, 2021, to march to the Capitol while a joint session of Congress was assembled there to count electoral votes and formalize Biden's victory, leading to hundreds storming the building and interrupting the electoral vote count; as a result, the House impeached Trump for incitement of insurrection on January 13, 2021, making him the only federal officeholder in American history to be impeached twice (the Senate would later acquit him for the second time on February 13, 2021, after he had already left office).

Venue 
Trump delivered his recorded address in the Blue Room of the White House.

Speech 
The speech was reminiscent of Trump's campaign stump speech, emphasizing the highlights of his term in office. He wished incoming President Biden well (without directly naming him), noting that the success and security of the country depended on his success as leader, while also implicitly warning Biden not to change or reverse some of his own policies upon taking over. Trump closed the speech on an optimistic note, stating his belief that his Make America Great Again movement was only just beginning, espousing confidence that it will continue to be a force in American politics. In doing so, he again suggested interest in either running for president again in 2024 himself or choosing a successor to run in his position. Nearly two years after leaving office, Trump officially announced his candidacy for president in 2024, on November 15, 2022.

References

External links 

 President Trump's farewell address (speech and transcript)

Presidency of Donald Trump
January 2021 events in the United States
2021 speeches
Speeches by Donald Trump
Farewell addresses
Articles containing video clips